Scorching Sun, Fierce Winds, Wild Fire, also released as Any Which Way You Punch and Dragon Connection, is a 1978 Taiwanese kung fu film starring Angela Mao, Dorian Tan, Chang Yi, and Lo Lieh.

Plot
Scorching Sun, Fierce Wind, Wild Fire is a story about a search for the second half of a treasure map, but it's conveniently forgotten at various points. Angela Mao plays the daughter of a warlord and has a secret identity as the masked freedom fighter Violet, who rides the country righting wrongs and organizing rebels. Tien Peng plays a mysterious stranger who comes to town looking for the other half of the map. Lo Lieh and Tan Tao Liang play prison inmates who escape and end up actually being ex-comrades with Tien Ping and assisting he and Violet in apprehending Master Wu (Chang Yi), the security chief who does most of the fighting for the warlord. Master Wu turns traitor in order to get the map.

Cast
 Angela Mao as Violet
 Dorian Tan as Escaped Convict #1
 Lo Lieh as Escaped Convict #2
 Chang Yi as Master Wu

Music
In the American dubbed version, during the opening scene as well as throughout the entire film, John Williams's score from Star Wars can be heard.

Reception
The French title of the film is La Belle aux mains de fer. The film was covered in the Hong Kong film magazine Cinemart in August 1977.

References

External links
 IMDb entry
 HK Cinemagic entry
 Scorching Sun, Fierce Winds, Wild Fire at the Hong Kong Movie Database
 La Belle aux mains de fer at  

Kung fu films
Taiwanese martial arts films
1978 films